Kappa-casein is a protein that in humans is encoded by the CSN3 gene.

Interactions
CSN3 (gene) has been shown to interact with EIF3S6.

References

External links

Further reading